বাংলা নাম আমকুড়চি বা কালী লতা।

Derris scandens is a plant species in the genus Derris of the family Fabaceae. It grows throughout the Indian subcontinent, Southeast Asia, Malesia and Australasia. It has been used as a herb in Thai traditional medicine for the treatment of musculoskeletal pain. Gastrointestinal symptoms were reported as the most serious side effects from its oral use.

References

External links 

Millettieae
Plants described in 1860